The K.L.E Society's KLE Institute of Technology (KLEIT) is an engineering college in Hubli, India. Established in 2008, it is one of the institutes under the banner of Karnatak Lingayat Education Society(KLE). KLEIT is approved by the AICTE and recognized by University Grant Commission of India. KLEIT is affiliated to Visvesvaraya Technological University, Belgaum for its BE,  MCA and M.Tech courses.

Academics
The institute has nine academic departments with the following degrees offered:

Rankings
KLEIT was placed into band of top 251-300 colleges in the National Institutional Ranking Framework (NIRF) 2021. It was the only engineering institution from North Karnataka under Visvesvaraya Technological University (VTU) to achieve this ranking.

External links

References 

Affiliates of Visvesvaraya Technological University
Educational institutions established in 2008
2008 establishments in Karnataka
All India Council for Technical Education
Engineering colleges in Dharwad